The Root of All Evil is an adventure module for the Dungeons & Dragons role-playing game. It was created for the Kingdoms of Kalamar campaign setting and published by Kenzer & Company. It is made for 1st-level players in a 64-page book written by Andy Miller. Its item code is K&C1100, and it was first published in 2001. It is the first adventure in the Coin of Power trilogy, the other two being Forging Darkness and Coin's End.

References 
 The Unseen Servant - The Root of all Evil

External links 
Kenzer & Company

Dungeons & Dragons modules
Fantasy role-playing game adventures
Role-playing game supplements introduced in 2001